Pompiliu Constantinescu  (May 17, 1901 – May 9, 1946) was a Romanian literary critic.

Biography

He was born on May 17, 1901 in Bucharest, "in a place where he saw the light of day for the first time, on Sabines Street no. 109, the son of John Constantinescu, a customs house clerk, who studied much and of Vasilica Petrescu, nephew, on his father's side, of Constantine Constantinescu, originally from the vineyard village of Ceptura, who settled in Bucharest, as a vineyard owner and merchant" (George Călinescu). 

He attended Gheorghe Lazăr and Mihai Viteazul High Schools in Bucharest, as well as educational tutorial classes, after which he attended the Faculty of Letters and Philosophy of the University of Bucharest. He published articles in Revista Fundațiilor Regale (The Royal Foundations Magazine), Kalende (Kalends), Mișcarea literară (The Literary Movement), Sburătorul, Viața literară (Literary Life) and Vremea (The weather). 

Constantinescu became the director of the CFR High School Aurel Vlaicu, where he taught Romanian language and literature.  He died from a heart attack on May 9, 1946 in Bucharest, while in full creative power.

Works
 Mișcarea literară (1927)
 Opere și autori (1928)
 Critice (1933)
 Figuri literare (1938)
 Tudor Arghezi (1940)
 Eseuri critice (1947)
 Scrieri alese (1957)
 Scrieri, vol. I-IV (1967–1972)
 Studii și cronici literare (1974)
 Poeți români moderni (1974)
 Caleidoscop (1974)
 Romanul românesc interbelic (1977)

Romanian literary critics
1901 births
1946 deaths
Gheorghe Lazăr National College (Bucharest) alumni
University of Bucharest alumni
Writers from Bucharest
Heads of schools in Romania